Su Chun-yueh (born 27 October 1970) is a Taiwanese athlete. She competed in the women's high jump at the 1988 Summer Olympics.

References

1970 births
Living people
Athletes (track and field) at the 1988 Summer Olympics
Taiwanese female high jumpers
Olympic athletes of Taiwan
Place of birth missing (living people)